Fides  (minor planet designation: 37 Fides) is a large main-belt asteroid. It was discovered by German astronomer Karl Theodor Robert Luther on October 5, 1855, and named after Fides, the Roman goddess of loyalty. Fides was the last of the main-belt asteroids to be assigned an iconic symbol. 37 Fides is also a S-type asteroid in the Tholen classification system.

Photometric observations of this asteroid at multiple observatories during 1981–82 gave an unusual light curve with three minima and maxima. The curve changed with varying phase angle of the asteroid relative to the viewer and the position of the Sun, indicating the changing influence of shadows cast by surface features. The composite light curve has a best fit period estimate of 7.33 hours. Austrian astronomer Hans Josef Schober has suggested that the multiple minima and maxima during each period may be an indication of a binary nature.

References

External links
 
 

Background asteroids
Fides
Fides
S-type asteroids (Tholen)
S-type asteroids (SMASS)
18551005

vec:Lista de asteroidi#37 Fides